Laurence Stevens  is a British graphic designer, famous for his sleeve designs and artworks for Eurythmics' and Annie Lennox's albums and singles. He was the original drummer for the English synth-pop band Blancmange.

References

External links

Living people
Year of birth missing (living people)
Place of birth missing (living people)
British artists
British graphic designers